2018 Gamba Osaka U-23 season.

J3 League

References

External links
 J.League official site

Gamba Osaka U-23
Gamba Osaka U-23 seasons